Abraham Kibiwot (born 4 June 1996) is a Kenyan steeplechase runner. He was a bronze medallist at the African Championships in Athletics in 2016. His personal best is 8:09.25 minutes, set in 2016.

Kibiwot made his international debut at the 2013 African Youth Athletics Championships, taking fifth in the 2000 metres steeplechase event. He raised his profile in 2015, first by winning the Kenyan junior trials and then by winning the gold medal at the 2015 African Junior Athletics Championships, seeing off Ethiopia's reigning Youth Olympic champion Wogene Sebisibe Sidamo in Addis Ababa. He capped that season with a persona best of 8:22.10 minutes at the London Diamond League meet, ranking as the second-fastest under-20 athlete that year behind another Kenyan, Nicholas Kiptanui Bett.

Kibiwot made his breakthrough into the senior ranks in the 2016 season. He was prominent on the 2016 IAAF Diamond League circuit that year, starting with a personal best of 8:09.25 minutes to place third in Doha. He moved up to second behind Ezekiel Kemboi in Beijing and won his first race at Athletissima in Lausanne. He also took fifth places at the Herculis and Memorial Van Damme meets. He was the seventh fastest steeplechaser that year. Kibiwot ran at the 2016 Athletics Kenya Olympic Trials but withdrew from the final. He was, however, selected for the 2016 African Championships in Athletics, where he won his first major medal – a bronze behind Ethiopia's Chala Beyo and Tolosa Nurgi.

Personal bests
3000 metres – 7:56.05 min (2021)
5000 metres – 14:10.8 min (2015)
2000 metres steeplechase – 5:53.90 min (2013)
3000 metres steeplechase – 8:05.72 min (2019)

All information from All-Athletics profile

International competitions

Circuit wins
Athletissima: 2016

References

External links

Living people
1996 births
Kenyan male steeplechase runners
Commonwealth Games medallists in athletics
Commonwealth Games silver medallists for Kenya
Athletes (track and field) at the 2018 Commonwealth Games
Athletes (track and field) at the 2020 Summer Olympics
Olympic athletes of Kenya
Medallists at the 2018 Commonwealth Games